Denbigh Community Hospital is a community hospital in Denbigh, Wales. It is managed by the Betsi Cadwaladr University Health Board.

History
The hospital has its origins in the Denbighshire Dispensary which became the first voluntary hospital in Wales when it was established in Park Street in 1807. A purpose-built facility, which was designed by Thomas Harrison, was built in Park Street between 1810 and 1813. It started admitting inpatients and became the Denbighshire Infirmary and General Dispensary from March 1826.

It joined the National Health Service in 1948 and became a community hospital in the 1980s. The Princess Royal visited the hospital to celebrate its bi-centenary in October 2007.

References

Sources

NHS hospitals in Wales
Hospital buildings completed in 1875
Hospitals in Denbighshire
Betsi Cadwaladr University Health Board